Ron's Gone Wrong is a 2021 British-American computer-animated science fiction comedy film directed by Sarah Smith and Jean-Philippe Vine (in his feature directorial debut), co-directed by Octavio E. Rodriguez and written by Peter Baynham and Smith. The film features the voice of Jack Dylan Grazer as Barney, a socially awkward middle-schooler who befriends a defective robot he names Ron, voiced by Zach Galifianakis. Barney must find a way to protect Ron, who comes under danger from corporate employees. Additional voices include Ed Helms, Justice Smith, Rob Delaney, Kylie Cantrall, Ricardo Hurtado, and Olivia Colman.

Ron's Gone Wrong is the first feature film from Locksmith Animation, and was animated by DNEG Animation. Animation and voice acting for the film were all done remotely during the COVID-19 pandemic.

The film had its world premiere at the 2021 BFI London Film Festival on October 9, 2021, and was theatrically released in the United Kingdom on October 15, 2021, and in the United States on October 22, 2021, by 20th Century Studios. It is the first animated feature film to be theatrically released under the studio's new name, 20th Century Studios, following the acquisition of 21st Century Fox by Disney. The film grossed $60.7 million worldwide and received generally positive reviews from critics.

Plot
Tech giant Bubble unveils their latest creation: the B-bot, created by Bubble's CEO Marc Wydell with the intent to make a robot buddy that is designed to help make friends via algorithm. In the town of Nonsuch, California, middle schooler Barney Pudowski, whose mother passed away, is the only kid in his class who does not have a B-bot. His former childhood friends, Savannah Meades, Rich Belcher, Noah, and Ava have all become absorbed by their individual B-bots. On Barney's birthday, his father, Graham, and his grandmother, Donka, come to realize that he does not have any friends. They hastily go to a Bubble store, but it closes for the day, leading them to buy a slightly damaged one from the store's delivery driver.

Barney receives the B-bot as his late-birthday gift, but upon activating it, he quickly learns that it is defective and glitchy. Not wanting to upset his father, Barney decides to take it back to the Bubble store to get it fixed, but ends up running into Rich and his friends, who taunt and try to humiliate Barney. The B-bot begins to fight back as his safety functions have been disabled, with him and Barney happily running off. However, Rich calls the police and they, along with Graham and Donka, are taken to the Bubble store so that the B-bot can be recycled. Not wanting to see him go, Barney secretly rescues him and names him Ron, after the first few characters of his model number.

When Barney and Ron's actions are reported, Marc is happy to see Ron go against his programming while his fellow executive Andrew Morris views it as bad publicity, believing Ron must be destroyed for the issue to be resolved. Barney teaches Ron how to be a good friend and, while hanging out, runs into Savannah, who shows Ron that his purpose is to help Barney get friends. Despite Barney telling Savannah not to, she posts Ron's actions online, alerting Bubble. The next day, Ron gets out of the house and tries to get "friends" for Barney, bringing a series of random people to school. After Barney gets in trouble, Rich discovers Ron's unlocked function and downloads it, causing all the other B-bots to have their safety features turned off. The B-bots run wild, prompting a patch update to be sent to them, but not before Savannah is publicly humiliated.

Barney is kicked out from school and tells Ron off, but upon returning home, realizes that Ron was just trying to be a friend exactly the way he was taught.  He decides to run away with Ron when Bubble employees come for them. They briefly run into Savannah, still upset over her incident, and tells her that he’s going to hide in the woods. Meanwhile, while Andrew warns Marc about the ramifications of the B-bot, Marc sneaks away so that he can meet Ron while Bubble uses their resources to take control of all the B-bots to go looking for Ron and Barney in the woods. Due to the cold weather and Barney's asthma, he becomes weak and Ron brings him back to civilization just outside the school where Savannah, Rich, Noah and Ava rush out to help him.

Barney is taken to the hospital and recuperates before meeting Marc, who has patched Ron to make him like every other B-Bot. Barney demands that Marc access the cloud to get Ron's original personality, but Andrew has since taken over the company and locked Marc out. Through an elaborate plan in which Barney, Graham, Donka and Marc break into Bubble HQ, Barney manages to make it to the Bubble database, finds Ron's original data and uploads him back into his body, restoring him back to his original code. Seeing that Bubble has direct access to everyone's B-bot and realizing that several other people are just as lonely as he was, Barney suggests upgrading all the B-bots to have Ron's flaws. However, this means that Ron will be dispersed. Barney reluctantly says goodbye to Ron as his programming is spread to everyone, mixing Marc's friendship algorithm with Ron's code. Marc blackmails Andrew into giving his position of CEO back after secretly recording him admitting that the B-bots spy on their owners for profit.

Three months later, everyone has a faulty B-bot, but are happy with their weird and wild personalities. Barney (who is now allowed back in school) no longer has one, but has become much more sociable and has gotten close with his former friends. As they hang out at recess, a giant Bubble tower that overlooks Nonsuch produces Ron's face, implying that Ron could still be alive.

Voice cast

Production

Development and production
After founding Locksmith Animation, Sarah Smith wanted to create a film that observed the impact of the internet on children's relationships and self-esteem, which she realised could be made into a film after watching Her (2013), commenting "we have to make that film for kids, to [help] them evaluate those experiences". Smith approached Peter Baynham with one paragraph of story where a robot learns through imitation, Smith said that Baynham asked "what if it was an idiot and it was annoying?" Despite creating a British animated film, a creative decision was made to set it in a United States suburb. Locksmith co-founder Julie Lockhart explained, "From a design perspective, the fact that all the big tech companies are in California made it feel that’s where it should be. We're also making films for a global audience that may not specifically be about British culture."

Locksmith had a troubled history in securing a distributor for the project. In May 2016, the studio formed a production deal with Paramount Pictures in which they would distribute Locksmith's films under their Paramount Animation banner. However, the following year Paramount abandoned the deal when Paramount chairman and CEO Brad Grey was replaced by Jim Gianopulos. In September 2017, Locksmith formed a multi-year production deal with 20th Century Fox, which would distribute their films under the 20th Century Fox Animation label with Locksmith aiming to theatrically release a film every 12–18 months. The acquisition of 20th Century Fox by Disney led to concern that the distribution deal would be lost again. Smith said the resulting acquisition was "terrifying", and described the prospect of promoting the project to Disney executives as "carrying coals to Newcastle", but ultimately they were supportive of the project. After production began on the film, Locksmith moved to Warner Bros. Pictures for its future projects.

On October 12, 2017, it was announced that the project would be titled Ron's Gone Wrong, and will serve as the first animated feature film from Locksmith Animation. Alessandro Carloni and Jean-Phillipe Vine were announced to serve as the film's co-directors with Octavio E. Rodriguez. The visual effects company DNEG Animation was on board as a digital production partner to provide the film's computer animation (being credit under "Feature Animation by DNEG"). Also, Baynham, who previously worked with Smith on Arthur Christmas (2011), and Elisabeth Murdoch were announced to executive produce the film with Smith.

In test screenings, Smith was surprised to find that Donka was a popular character with children. The scene where Donka dances on a table with Ron was a favorite scene for children, and Smith viewed this as "comedy there that they haven't seen before".

Casting
Grazer first began recording lines for the role of Barney in 2017 when he was 13 and did not finalize his role until early 2021 by the time he was 18. Grazer said that it became difficult to maintain his 13-year-old prepubescent voice throughout the years of recording. He was originally introduced as a test voice for early animatics, but Smith kept him on after being astounded by the emotional range of his performance.

Galifianakis was instructed to perform much of his lines for the role of Ron in a deadpan voice, to convey that Ron is run by an algorithm and is not very emotional. He commented that this was challenging and unusual, because he had never had directors in the past ask for "less" emotion. Smith praised Helms performance as the role of Graham for skilfully improvising lines and contributing additional "touches" to the film, saying "You give him the lines and he’ll do six versions of his own and he’s hilarious".

Animation
The character of Ron was designed to be aesthetically reminiscent of "stripped-down" computer software, with the pixelated interfaces of the MS-DOS operating system being a source of inspiration. Emphasis was placed on allowing Ron's animated performance to be versatile within the constraints of his design, which demanded precise control over his motion graphics skin that deliver his facial expressions. This included allowing his face slide all across his body, such as his eyeballs appearing between his legs when picked up. Baynham explained "he doesn't have a face that you can do all the classic things with, but somehow he does... like the way his eye might slip a little bit... that speaks to his simple clownishness." Vine referred to Ron's behaviour as being alike to the Clippy personal assistant, describing him "cheerfully and annoyingly helpful all the time". Locksmith consulted with the toy designer Sphero to investigate what would be a realistic design for a social media robot. Vine said, "we wanted the movie to feel like it’s set right around now so the bot needs to feel tangible". Animation director Eric Leighton explained that it was important to track the emotional state of Ron to determine his range of behaviour. The scene where Ron physically attacks children is where he is "the most broken that a robot could possibly be", and the scene where he is reprogrammed is at his most benign. The whole movie was shot out of sequence in favor of doing scenes across his degrees of "brokeness". The character design of Barney was distinguished through coordinated color palettes; Barney's clothes are patterned in "earth tones" to indicate his love of nature, and his home is vibrant in contrast to the muted colors of other homes in the town he lives in. In the storyboards of the film, Barney was originally going to have an shaped keyhole on his shirt to represent Locksmith's logo.

DNEG had to develop a new "shot-based" animation process for creating the film, in changeover from previously specializing in visual effects for live-action cinema. The animation software Pixar RenderMan was used for the film, and the Universal Scene Description file format was adopted a third of the way during production.

Production was impacted by the COVID-19 pandemic in 2020. Animation for the film was done remotely with crew members working from home, which included digital modelling, rigging, and lighting. Editors faced difficulty assembling footage with temporarily out-of-sync audio, which impaired judgement over the timing of edits. Voice acting was also done remotely, and involved makeshift home recording setups where blankets were used for soundproofing. A voice actor even had to ask family members sharing an internet connection to come offline, in order to free bandwidth for a recording session.

A labor dispute arose over DNEG announcing 20%-25% pay cuts to employees earning more than £35,000 (GBP) per year, which it said was due to business disruption caused by COVID-19. This led to 169 employees signing a collective grievance statement. The move was later partially reversed; DNEG was forced to reach deals with its business partners, this included Locksmith who agreed to offer a salary top-up and completion bonus to employees working on the film. The trade union BECTU condemned DNEG for its refusal to communicate with the union, and said its response to the collective grievance was deliberately indirect. The film took approximately five years to complete.

Musical score and soundtrack album

Henry Jackman composed the film score. Speaking about the score, Jackman said that "it has its own identity, similar to Wreck-It Ralph or Big Hero 6" having the "same musical landscape and color in this film", and also had enjoyed working in the film, calling the scoring sessions as "enormous fun". Vine and Smith expressed gratitude to Jackman on how his score elevated the film. Smith wanted the score to have a "contemporary John Hughes feel along with a classic 'high school movie' vibe and the orchestral scale and emotion of E.T. on top". The score was recorded at Abbey Road Studios and Air Studios in London, England.

Jackman composed most of the tracks, with two songs in collaboration with Dave Bayley of the indie-pop band Glass Animals. Liam Payne performed an original song titled "Sunshine" and its music video was released on August 27, 2021. The soundtrack was released digitally on October 15, 2021 by Walt Disney Records and in physical formats on October 22.

Release
In October 2017, Ron's Gone Wrong was scheduled for a theatrical release on November 6, 2020. In November 2019, the film was moved to February 26, 2021. In May 2020, the film was moved to April 23, 2021 as a result of the COVID-19 pandemic. On January 22, 2021, the film was then delayed further to October 22, 2021 in RealD 3D originally. The film also had its world premiere as the headlining act of the 2021 BFI London Film Festival on October 9, 2021 making it a Special BFI Presentation. On the same date, the film premiered at the 36th Guadalajara International Film Festival's Guadalajara opening celebration event. The film was premiered in United Kingdom on October 15, 2021. The film also held a special surprise screening premiere at the El Capitan Theatre on the day of its USA theatrical release date of October 22, 2021. The film played exclusively in theaters for 45 days before heading to digital platforms.

The film is also the only film under Locksmith's deal with 20th Century Studios, as the animation studio struck a new deal with Warner Bros. Pictures to distribute future films under Warner Animation Group.

Marketing and promotion
TOMY made a deal with 20th Century Studios and Locksmith Animation to develop and promote the film's toys including plush toys and action figures.

Home media
Ron's Gone Wrong was released on DVD, Blu-ray and Ultra HD Blu-ray on December 7, 2021 and on Digital on December 15, 2021 by Walt Disney Studios Home Entertainment. Special features include Questions and Answers with Jack Dylan Grazer and Zach Galifianakis calling "A Boy and His B-bot", a Making Ron Right featurette and the music video of the film's soundtrack album's one and only original hit song called "Sunshine" by British English singer and songwriter Liam Payne. Ron's Gone Wrong became available for streaming on HBO Max and Disney+ on December 15, 2021, after Disney reached a deal with WarnerMedia for a majority of the upcoming films from 20th Century Studios to be streamed collaboratively between Disney+, HBO Max and Hulu until HBO's deal with 20th Century, signed before Disney's acquisition of the company in 2012, runs out at the end of 2022. Ron's Gone Wrong also made its American television premiere on HBO on December 18, 2021.

Reception

Box office
Ron's Gone Wrong grossed $23 million in the United States and Canada and $37.7 million in other territories for a worldwide total of $60.7 million. In the United States and Canada, the film was released alongside Dune and was projected to gross around $10 million from 3,065 theaters in its opening weekend. The film made $2.3 million on its first day, including $260,000 from Thursday night previews. It went on to debut in fifth place with $7.3 million. On its second weekend, the film fell 48% and made $3.7 million. Brennan Klein of Screen Rant speculated the film to be a box office disappointment due to its low performance and undisclosed budget.

Critical response
Ron's Gone Wrong received generally positive reviews from critics. On the review aggregation website Rotten Tomatoes, the film holds an approval rating of 80% with a "Certified Fresh" rating, based on 100 reviews, with an average rating of 6.6/10. The website's critical consensus reads: "It isn't the first animated film to confront technology creep, but in terms of striking an entertaining balance between humor and heart, Ron's Gone Wrong gets it right." On Metacritic, the film has a score of 65 out of 100 based on 23 critics, indicating "generally favorable reviews". Audiences polled by CinemaScore gave the film an average grade of "A" on an A+ to F scale.

James Mottram of The South China Morning Post wrote: "sweet, heart-warming and frighteningly prescient, Ron's Gone Wrong is one of the best animated films in recent memory." Tim Robey of The Daily Telegraph gave the film four out of five stars and said that the film is "visualized with verve" and that "it's a zingy and mercilessly funny satire on how devices, with their ever-so-friendly interfaces, have in fact become our despots." Ben Kenigsberg of The New York Times said "As family entertainment, it's fine." Peter Bradshaw of The Guardian gave the film three out of five stars, saying that the film was "entertaining, though composed with algorithmic precision", adding that "it winds up suspiciously neutral about whether kids really should abandon digital enslavement in favour of real-life human friends." Pat Padua of The Washington Post gave the film three out of four stars, writing that it "has plenty of slapstick and potty humor for kids. But adults will also be intrigued by its frequently scathing (albeit somewhat conflicted) critique of consumerism." Mark Kermode said that the film was "really good fun and a real surprise."

Anna Smith of Deadline Hollywood Daily wrote that the film was "one for all the family - just put your cellphones away first." Brandon Zachary of CBR wrote "What starts as a movie you'd expect to know every twist to transcends into something far more interesting." Charles Bramesco of The A.V. Club wrote: "As in the curiously similar The Mitchells vs. the Machines, the misadventures transmit a light-hearted commentary on the wonders and hazards of our screen-saturated culture." Wendy Ide of Screen International said that the film "transcends the familiarity of the story with deft writing, appealing animation and a big heart crammed into a small malfunctioning robot." Angie Han of The Hollywood Reporter wrote "What the animated feature lacks in daring imagination, it makes up for with endearing good humor, thoughtful cultural critique and one heck of a cute robot." Mark Kennedy of the Associated Press was more critical of the film, describing it as "a derivative tale about a middle schooler and his quirky computer sidekick" and writing that it "seems to want to preach we should all disconnect from our devices and restore human contact. But then what will the filmmakers do with all that adorable merch?" Michael Ordoña of The Los Angeles Times wrote that the film "dots its primer on friendship with chase scenes and warnings about Big Tech with only mixed success." Yolanda Machando of TheWrap wrote that the film "offers partially realized messaging about social media while populating the story with elementary sight gags, too many overused "fish out of water" tropes and attractive merchandise options."

Audience viewership
According to Nielsen ratings, Ron's Gone Wrong was the third most streamed feature film worldwide across all major platforms between December 13 and December 19, 2021. Screen Rant reported that within the United States it was the most viewed feature film on Disney+ after two days of appearing on the service on December 15.

Accolades, awards and nominations

References

External links
 
 

2020s American animated films
2020s British animated films
2020s English-language films
2020s adventure comedy films
2020s satirical films
2020s science fiction comedy films
2020s teen comedy films
2021 comedy films
2021 computer-animated films
2021 directorial debut films
2021 science fiction films
20th Century Studios animated films
20th Century Animation films
20th Century Studios films
3D animated films
American 3D films
American adventure comedy films
American children's animated comic science fiction films
American computer-animated films
American high school films
American teen comedy films
American robot films
American satirical films
Animated films about friendship
Animated films about robots
Animated films set in California
Animated films set in the future
British 3D films
British children's animated films
British animated science fiction films
British computer-animated films
British satirical films
Films about artificial intelligence
Films about asthma
Films about social media
Films about technological impact
Films about technology
Films impacted by the COVID-19 pandemic
Films postponed due to the COVID-19 pandemic
Films scored by Henry Jackman
Films with screenplays by Peter Baynham
Middle school films
TSG Entertainment films
TSG Entertainment animated films
2020s British films